Hibbertia juncea is a species of flowering plant in the family Dilleniaceae and is endemic to the Northern Territory. It is a small shrub with leaves reduced to minute scales, and white to cream-coloured or pink flowers arranged in leaf axils with seven to ten stamens.

Description
The leaves are reduced to minute scales. Flowering occurs from November to August.

Taxonomy
This species was first formally described in 1863 by George Bentham who gave it the name Pachynema junceum in Flora Australiensis. In 2009, James W. Horn changed the name to Hibbertia juncea in the International Journal of Plant Sciences.

Distribution and habitat
This hibbertia grows in savanna and is widespread and common from the Victoria River to north-eastern Arnhem Land in the northern part of the Northern Territory.

Conservation status
Hibbertia juncea is classified as "least concern" under the Territory Parks and Wildlife Conservation Act 1976.

See also
List of Hibbertia species

References

juncea
Flora of the Northern Territory
Plants described in 1863
Taxa named by George Bentham